Cantley is a civil parish in the metropolitan borough of Doncaster, South Yorkshire, England.  The parish contains eight listed buildings that are recorded in the National Heritage List for England.  Of these, one is listed at Grade II*, the middle of the three grades, and the others are at Grade II, the lowest grade.  The parish contains the village of Old Cantley and the surrounding area.  The major building in the parish is Cantley Hall, which is listed, together with its stables, a house in the drive, and the ha-ha and a sundial in the grounds.  The other listed buildings are a former windmill, a mill chimney, and a barn.


Key

Buildings

References

Citations

Sources

 

Lists of listed buildings in South Yorkshire
Buildings and structures in the Metropolitan Borough of Doncaster